Sun Xueling (born 1979) is a Singaporean politician who has been serving as Minister of State for Social and Family Development since 2020 and Minister of State for Home Affairs since 2022. She previously served as Minister of State for Education between 2020 and 2022. A member of the governing People's Action Party (PAP), she has been the Member of Parliament (MP) representing Punggol West SMC since 2020.

Prior to entering politics, Sun had worked at the Economic Development Board, DBS Bank, Temasek International, Deutsche Bank AG and Macquarie Securities. 

She made her political debut in the 2015 general election as part of a six-member PAP team contesting in Pasir Ris–Punggol GRC and won 72.89% of the vote.

She served as Senior Parliamentary Secretary for Home Affairs and Senior Parliamentary Secretary for National Development concurrently between 2018 and 2020. 

During the 2020 general election, she contested as a solo PAP candidate in Punggol West SMC and won 60.98% of the vote. She was subsequently promoted to Minister of State in 2020.

Early life and education
Sun was brought up mostly by her grandmother, who was widowed at the age of 33 with six children as Sun's parents were both busy in their full-time jobs. She grew up in a flat in Clementi with her younger sister before moving to Ang Mo Kio. 

Having been encouraged by her grandmother to help the needy, she started doing volunteering work in 2001, while she was studying at the National University of Singapore, from which she graduated with a Bachelor of Social Sciences degree in economics. 

She subsequently went on to complete a Master of Science with merit degree in international political economy at the London School of Economics.

Career
Sun started her career in the Economic Development Board in 2003 before she joined DBS Bank as an Assistant Vice-President. She was Director of Investment Groups at Temasek Holdings and had spent eight years based in Hong Kong and China working for as a Director for Deutsche Bank AG and as Senior Vice-President for Macquarie Securities. She was also the Chief Executive Officer of Business China from 1 November 2015 to 20 May 2018.

Political career
Sun was introduced by the People's Action Party (PAP) as a candidate contesting in Pasir Ris–Punggol GRC on 1 August 2015 in the lead-up to the 2015 general election. Before her candidacy was announced, she had been very active in grassroots activities in Buona Vista since 2001 and had been advocating women and mothers' rights. During the campaigning period for the 2015 general election, Sun was the target of xenophobic comments online because her name, which is in hanyu pinyin, misled people into thinking that she was a new Singaporean citizen originally from China.

The PAP team contesting in Pasir Ris–Punggol GRC during the 2015 general election won with 72.89% of the vote against the Singapore Democratic Alliance, and Sun thus became a Member of Parliament representing the Punggol West ward of Pasir Ris–Punggol GRC. On 1 May 2018, Sun was appointed Senior Parliamentary Secretary at the Ministry of Home Affairs and Ministry of National Development. In 2019, Sun appeared in the fourth episode of the Channel 8 television series A Conversation with the Minister 2019.

During the 2020 general election, Sun contested as a solo PAP candidate in Punggol West SMC, which was previously part of Pasir Ris–Punggol GRC. She won with 60.98% of the vote against the Workers' Party's Tan Chen Chen, and continued serving as the Member of Parliament for Punggol West. On 27 July 2020, she was promoted to Minister of State and appointed to the Ministry of Social and Family Development and Ministry of Education. In 2021, Sun appeared with Grace Fu in a segment of the Channel 8 television series A Conversation with the Minister in the third and finale episode about health. On 13 June 2022, Sun was appointed Minister of State at the Ministry of Home Affairs and relinquished the Education portfolio.

Personal life
Sun is married to an information technology entrepreneur who was born in Beijing and subsequently became a Singapore citizen in 2009. They have two daughters together.

References

External links
 Sun Xueling on Parliament of Singapore

1979 births
Living people
Members of the Parliament of Singapore
People's Action Party politicians
Singaporean people of Hokkien descent
Singaporean politicians of Chinese descent
CHIJ Saint Nicholas Girls' School alumni
Singaporean women in politics